Arriva Midlands is a bus operator providing services in the East Midlands and West Midlands areas of England. It is a subsidiary of Arriva UK Bus.

Arriva Midlands North Operations

In September 1981 Midland Red North was formed with 230 buses operating from six depots in Shropshire, Staffordshire and the West Midlands as part of the breakup of the Midland Red bus company. In May 1983 the Ludlow depot was closed. In January 1988 Midland Red North was sold to the Drawlane Transport Group. In November 1992 it was sold to British Bus which in August 1996 was sold to the Cowie Group.

In 2003 the Arriva Midlands North garages in Crewe, Macclesfield and Winsford were transferred to Arriva North West. The remaining parts of Arriva Midlands North were combined with Arriva Derby and Arriva Fox County to form Arriva Midlands. Buses still operate with Arriva Midlands North legal name (except Burton upon Trent which used Stevensons of Uttoxeter).

In February 2007 the business of Chase Coaches was purchased with 27 buses with operations integrated into Arriva's Cannock depot.
In late 2007 a new ChaseLinx brand (similar to the Leicester Linx brand below) was introduced, reflecting the purchase of Chase Coaches.

In December 2007 Swadlincote depot closed with operations transferred to Burton upon Trent. In August 2008 the Hinckley depot and services were sold to Centebus Holdings. In January 2009 Shifnal depot closed while in the same month Bridgnorth reopened.

In December 2010 the business of Wardle Transport, Stoke-on-Trent was purchased with 64 buses, followed in June 2011 by the Staffordshire operations of D&G Bus with 30 buses that was integrated with Wardle Transport and in August 2012 Midland of Wednesfield from D&G Bus with 61 buses.

In May 2015, D&G Bus purchased Wardle transport back from Arriva Midlands with 19 buses.

On 23 April 2017 the Wednesfield depot closed with some services passing to Diamond Buses with nine vehicles and the remainder of vehicles reallocated to other depots. The depot had only reopened in March 2013 after a refurbishment.

In 2017, four Arriva Shires & Essex depots (Milton Keynes, Luton, Aylesbury and High Wycombe), and their routes, were transferred into the management of Arriva Midlands. The vehicles were renumbered in late 2018 and early 2019 to avoid multiple vehicles having the same fleet numbers.

Arriva announced that from 1 April 2018 that no buses from their Cannock depot would run during the evenings and Sundays as a result of Staffordshire County Council funding cuts. Hundreds signed an online petition within the first week, which quickly lead to thousands including backing from two local MPs.

In November 2020 it was announced that the Cannock Depot would be sold to D&G bus, with services being operated under the Chaserider brand from the end of service on the 9th of January 2021.

Derbyshire Operations

In 1994 Derby City Transport was privatised and sold to British Bus. In August 1996 British Bus was purchased by the Cowie Group and the operation rebranded as Arriva Derby.

Arriva previously had a depot in Burton Upon Trent until August 2016 when the operations passed to Midland Classic.

Leicestershire Operations

In September 1981 Midland Red East was formed with 181 buses operating from five depots in Derbyshire, Leicestershire, Lincolnshire and Nottinghamshire as part of the breakup of the Midland Red bus company, and in January 1984 was renamed Midland Fox. In 1987 it was privatised in a management buyout. Several smaller operators including Loughborough Bus & Coach Company were purchased and in 1989 it was sold to the Drawlane Group. In November 1992 it was sold to British Bus which in August 1996 was sold to the Cowie Group and later renamed Arriva Fox County.

Arriva Midlands East currently operate from three depots within the Leicestershire area these are Thurmaston, Coalville and Barwell.

In September 2013, Arriva purchased Centrebus Groups shares in Centrebus Holdings with their Hinckley operations becoming Hinckley Bus which operated as a part of Arriva Midlands  During late 2018 they merged operations into the main Arriva Midlands business.

Arriva announced in August 2021 after 64 years they will be closing their South Wigston depot during October 2021 with all services moving to Thurmaston depot.

Depots

Current Depots 
Arriva Midlands operate eleven depots as of January 2022 in:
 Derby
 Oswestry
 Shrewsbury
 Tamworth
 Telford
 Thurmaston also the HQ for Arriva Midlands
 Barwell also the depot for ArrivaClick services in Leicester
 Milton Keynes
 Luton
 Aylesbury
 High Wycombe

In 2017, four Arriva Shires & Essex depots (Milton Keynes, Luton, Aylesbury and High Wycombe), and their routes, were transferred into the management of Arriva Midlands. The vehicles were renumbered in late 2018 and early 2019 to avoid multiple Arriva Midlands vehicles sharing the same fleet numbers.

In 2018 the Cannock depot began closing entirely on Sundays due to county council subsidy cuts, leaving Cannock without buses, with the Cannock depot being sold to D&G bus in January 2021.

In 2023, Arriva announced that it planned to close the Oswestry depot as a result of low patronage and financial difficulties following the Covid-19 pandemic. Most services operated from Oswestry would be moved to Shrewsbury and Arriva Buses Wales' Wrexham depot if the planned closure is approved.

Former Depots 
 Cannock - purchased by D&G Bus in November 2020, and was transferred on 9 January 2021. 
Burton-upon-Trent - purchased by Midland Classic in 2016
 Wednesfield - closed in 2017 due to loss of most Transport for West Midlands contracted services. Nine vehicles and remaining tendered routes sold to Diamond Bus. Commercially run routes 35, and 35A were moved to Cannock Depot, while routes 10, 10A, and 10B were transferred to Telford Depot. Service 10 has since been withdrawn by Arriva (after a spell being operated by Cannock depot) with the 10A & 10B now operated by National Express.
 Bridgnorth depot, an outstation of Telford, operated services 585-588 in South Staffordshire along with service 9, 297, 101 and 436.  The depot closed with the ending of the 585-588 routes in 2012 with services being operated by Shrewsbury (436) and Telford (other routes). It was located on the Stanmore Industrial Estate.
 Wellington - replaced by new depot in Telford.
Southgates - Former Midland Fox garage closed in 2009 and operations were merged with the Thurmaston Depot
 Wigston - Closed 31 October 2021

References

External links
 Company website
 

Midlands
Transport companies established in 1981
Transport in Leicestershire
1981 establishments in England
Bus operators in Leicestershire